Richard Maxwell (born 1967) is an American experimental theater director and playwright in New York City. He is the artistic director of the New York City Players.

Life and career
Originally from West Fargo, North Dakota, Maxwell began his professional career with the Steppenwolf Theatre Company. While in Chicago, he became a co-founder and a director of the Cook County Theater Department.

In 2000, Maxwell received a Foundation for Contemporary Arts Grant to Artists award, along with a project grant from Creative Capital. In 2010, Maxwell received a Guggenheim Fellowship and in 2012 received the Doris Duke Performing Artist Award.   Also in 2012, Maxwell was an invited artist in the Whitney Biennial.

Publications

References

External links
 NYC Players.org – The New York City Players
 BOMB Magazine  – Interview by John Kelsey

1967 births
20th-century American dramatists and playwrights
American theatre directors
Illinois State University alumni
Living people
People from West Fargo, North Dakota